The Downtown Diaries is a book written by Jim Carroll depicting his life from the years 1971 to 1973. While the book was called The Downtown Diaries, it was not a literal diary, such as The Basketball Diaries. Carroll had stated that most of Forced Entries was written by memory and may or may not have been totally accurate.

Most of the entries in the book are about the times of Carroll's artist career taking off, working with the likes of Andy Warhol in his Factory, hanging out at Max's Kansas City, hanging out with the Velvet Underground. It was stated that he changed the names of many people in the book, not so much for the threat of lawsuits, but due to not wanting his book being purchased and successful by name dropping. For example, “Jenny Ann” was actually Patti Smith, while “D.M.Z.” was the painter/artist Larry Rivers.

The Downtown Diaries also took a look at Carroll's heroin addiction, and his desire to get clean. It details his turning to Methadone treatment and leaving New York City for California and his detox and return to New York with a new life.

1987 books
American memoirs